Datinakhali is a village in Buri Goalini Union, Shyamnagar Upazila, Satkhira District, Bangladesh. Its villagers obtain drinking water from the nearby village of Kolbari.

See also
 List of villages in Bangladesh
 Upazilas of Bangladesh
 Districts of Bangladesh
 Divisions of Bangladesh

References

Populated places in Khulna Division
Villages in Khulna District
Villages in Khulna Division